Lynx Football Club Women is an amateur association football club in Gibraltar, currently playing in the Gibraltar Women's Football League. The club, formed in 2020, is affiliated to Lynx.

History
The club formed in 2020 after Lincoln Red Imps decided to disband their women's team, announcing its first signings along with its intention to compete on 1 December 2020. The team played their first ever game 2 weeks later, in the Gibraltar Women's Football League against Lions Gibraltar, a 3-0 defeat. After their first season, manager Col Griffiths stepped down on 30 June 2021.

Current squad

References

2020 establishments in Gibraltar
Women's football clubs in Gibraltar